Lewer is a surname. Notable people with the surname include:

Andrew Lewer (born 1971), British politician
David Lewer (1919–2005), English author, architect, historian, and choral musician
Ethel Harriet Comyns-Lewer (1861–1946), British ornithologist and periodical editor, publisher and owner
John D. Lewer (1886-1943), American businessman, farmer, and politician
Richard Lewer (born 1970), Australian artist

See also
Lewers